DJ Olive (also known as The Audio Janitor; born Gregor Asch) is an American disc jockey and turntablist. He is known for producing music generally in the electronic genre, with strong influences of dub, and free improvisation styles. He is widely credited with coining of the term "Illbient" in 1994. He was a founding member of the immersionist group Lalalandia Entertainment Research Corporation in 1991.

DJ Olive is a member of We, Lunchbox and Liminal. He has also collaborated with Kim Gordon, Ikue Mori, William Hooker, Zeena Parkins, Uri Caine, Medeski Martin and Wood, Dave Douglas, and various others.

Associated acts
Kim Gordon (Sonic Youth, Ciccone Youth, Free Kitten)
Ikue Mori (DNA, Kato Hideki, Badawi, Subdub, Butch Morris, John Zorn, Mike Patton, Electric Masada, Amanda Stewart)
Zeena Parkins, Uri Caine, Medeski Martin and Wood Dave Douglas, Anthony Coleman, Keystone, Roscoe 'Fatty' Arbuckle, Marcus Rojas, William Hooker, (Thurston Moore, Elliott Sharp)

Discography
dj olive. Coco, Record blanks
dj olive. So Me Free, Record blanks
dj olive. Homeless Records, Record blanks
dj olive. Moon Wax, Record blanks
dj olive. Vinyl Scores Live at Kootenay Coop Radio, Record blanks
dj olive. Vinyl Scores Live at Berghain, Record blanks
dj olive. Balm, Record blanks
dj olive, THWIS, the Agriculture
dj olive, "Heaps As" Live in Tasmania, the Agriculture
dj olive, Bodega, the Agriculture
dj olive, Coonymus ep, the Agriculture
dj olive, Triage, ROOM40
dj olive, Sleep, ROOM40
dj olive, Buoy, ROOM40
We™, Decentertainment, Home Entertainment,
We™, Square root of negative one, Asphodel
We™, "as is", Asphodel
We™, Asphodelic, Asphodel
We™, Sonar99. La recopilacion, so dens
We™, crooklyn dub vol 1, Word sound
We™, Valis: assassination of syntax, subharmonic
We™, Mysteries of creation, Axiom
We™, Necropolis Mix, Knitting Factory Works
We™, The Antenna Tool and Die Session, Asphodel
We™, Home Entertainment Vol. 2, Liquid Sky Music
We™, Home Entertainment Vol. 3, Liquid Sky Music
We™, Rock& Roll, this is jungle sky vol. 5, Liquid Sky Music
We™, Land of the Baboon, Silent
We™, You Mix, Incursions in Illbient, Asphodel
Lunchbox, Anyways, the Agriculture
Lunchbox, Incite:20, XLR8R
Kim Gordon, Dj Olive, Ikue Mori, SYR 5
DJ Olive & J.P. Dessy, Scories, Sub Rosa
BBQ Beets II, returturn of the yams, the Agriculture.com
Barbecue Beets, sunrise on a rooftop in brooklyn, the agriculture
Liminal, Live at the Whitney Museum Series, Knitting Factory Works
Liminal, Nosferatu Soundtrack, Knitting Factory Works
Liminal, Pre Set, Knitting Factory Works
Keter, Zohar, Knitting Factory Works
Elliot Sharp, State of the Union, Zoar
Funk, this is jungle sky vol.6. Liquid Sky Music
Welcome to Execrate, Leaf
Ben Neill, Triptycal, Antilles
William Hooker, Armageddon, Homestead Records
William Hooker, Mindfulness, Knitting Factory Works
William Hooker,Compexity #2, Kos recordings
Cloudwatch vol. 2. Sonic Soul
Gerard Malanga, Up from the Archives, Sub Rosa
BitStreams, Sound work exhibition at the Whitney Museum, JDK
A Mutated Christmas, Illegal Art
Copier.Coller, Quatermass, La Batie, Sub Rosa
The turntable sessions, vol 1,Amulet Records
Drop the Needle, illy B Eats remixes and breakbeats, Amulet Records
Melatonin, Room 40
Dj Olive meets I/O, Powerhouse Sessions, Room 40
Polyhedric Tetrapak, Ooze.bap records
NXS, Sleeper, Music Mine
Soundworks, Whitney Biennial 2002, Whitney
Blue Marble, Aiko Shimada, Tzadik
EMIT, One, Electronic music information technology
City Sonics, Transcultures
Christian Marclay, dj Trio, Asphodel
Christian Marclay, dj Trio, Live at the Hirshhorn 2002, Cuneiform Records
Liquid Architecture #6, Liquid Architecture Festival Melbourne
Matt Haimovitz, Goulash, Oxingale records
Matt Haimovitz Tod Machover, The Vinyl Cello, Oxingale records
Benefit Compilation For Japan, Various Artists Of Kompakt Distribution
2008 Mutek Festival Compilation, Mutek Records
Air Texture Vol 3, Air Texture
With Uri Caine
Urlicht / Primal Light (Winter & Winter, 1997)
Gustav Mahler in Toblach (Winter & Winter, 1999)
The Goldberg Variations (Winter & Winter, 2000)
Gustav Mahler: Dark Flame (Winter & Winter, 2003)
Shelf-Life (Winter & Winter, 2005)
Uri Caine Ensemble Plays Mozart (Winter & Winter, 2006)
With Dave Douglas
Keystone (Greenleaf, 2005)
Moonshine (Greenleaf, 2007)
Spark of Being (Greenleaf, 2010)
With Medeski, Martin & Wood
Uninvisible (Blue Note, 2002)

Remix's include work for:
vida blue
Bill Laswell
sporangia
celluid mata
Kompakt
telekenetic soulmate
48 cameras
Choro Club
Nettle
Rinken
Mono
Zu
the McDades
Medeski Martin & Wood

Remixed by WE (TM):
Free Kitten
Medeski Martin and Wood
Tipsy
Arto Lindsay
Soul Slinger
the Dylan group

References

External links
 Official Site
 Facebook page

Living people
American DJs
American electronic musicians
Electronic dance music DJs
Illbient
Year of birth missing (living people)